The 1975 Rothmans Canadian Open was a tennis tournament played on outdoor clay courts at the Toronto Lawn Tennis Club in Toronto in Canada that was part of the 1975 Commercial Union Assurance Grand Prix and of the 1975 WTA Tour. The tournament was held from August 11 through August 17, 1975.

Finals

Men's singles
 Manuel Orantes defeated  Ilie Năstase 7–6(7–4), 6–0, 6–1
 It was Orantes' 10th title of the year and the 35th of his career.

Women's singles
 Marcie Louie defeated  Laura DuPont 6–1, 4–6, 6–4
 It was Louie's 1st title of the year and the 1st of her career.

Men's doubles
 Cliff Drysdale /  Raymond Moore defeated  Jan Kodeš /  Ilie Năstase 6–4, 5–7, 7–6
 It was Drysdale's 2nd title of the year and the 9th of his career. It was Moore's only title of the year and the 3rd of his career.

Women's doubles
 Julie Anthony /  Margaret Court defeated  JoAnne Russell /  Jane Stratton 6–2, 6–4
 It was Anthony's 1st title of the year and the 1st of her career. It was Court's 1st title of the year and the 133rd of her career.

References

External links
 
 Association of Tennis Professionals (ATP) tournament profile
 Women's Tennis Association (WTA) tournament profile

Canadian Open (tennis)
Rothmans Canadian Open
Rothmans Canadian Open
Rothmans Canadian Open
Rothmans Canadian Open
Canadian Open